Hawthorn is a village in County Durham, England. It is situated between Seaham and Easington.

The only public building in the village of Hawthorn is the Staplyton Arms, a small public house situated in roughly the centre of the village.

Close by Hawthorn Dene's mouth, there was until the late 1970s, a large Gothic Revival house, named "Hawthorn Towers" once the family home of Major Anderson, who was connected with the Building of the Middlesbrough Transporter Bridge.

References

External links

Villages in County Durham